The women's 80 metres hurdles event at the 1938 British Empire Games was held on 10 and 12 February at the Sydney Cricket Ground in Sydney, Australia.

Medalists

Results

Heats
Qualification: First 3 in each heat (Q) qualify directly for the final.

Final

References

Athletics at the 1938 British Empire Games
1938